Club de Fútbol Atlético Ciudad was a Spanish football club based in Murcia, in the autonomous community of Murcia. Founded in 2007, it played its last season in Segunda División B (group IV), holding home matches at Estadio Juan de la Cierva, with a 1,600-seat capacity. The club was refounded in 2010 as CAP Ciudad de Murcia.

History
On 6 June 2007, Ciudad de Murcia was acquired by an investor from Granada, transferring to that city and being renamed it Granada 74 CF. As the second division team moved to Granada, the reserve team and the Escuela Municipal Deporte Lorquí merged, and CA Ciudad de Lorquí was founded. 

On 31 October 2008, the team changed its name to Club de Fútbol Atlético Ciudad. Two years later, on 1 August, it was forced to relegate to Tercera División after not being able to pay a debt of €700,000 euros, which consequently led to the club being dissolved.

Club names
Club Atlético Ciudad de Lorquí (2007–08)
Club de Fútbol Atlético Ciudad (2008–10)

Season to season

2 seasons in Segunda División B
1 season in Tercera División

Last squad (2009–10)

Famous players
 Cristian Díaz
 Julio Iglesias
 Patrick Amoah

See also
CAV Murcia 2005, the club's volleyball section.

References

External links
Official website 
Futbolme team profile 

Association football clubs established in 2007
Association football clubs disestablished in 2010
Defunct football clubs in the Region of Murcia
2007 establishments in Spain
2010 disestablishments in Spain
Sport in Murcia